Augocoris illustris is a species of shield-backed bug in the family Scutelleridae. It is found in the Caribbean Sea, Central America, North America, and South America.

References

Scutelleridae
Articles created by Qbugbot
Insects described in 1781